This is a List of Petaluma Historic Landmarks and Districts.  Petaluma Historic Landmarks are historic resources in Petaluma, California that the Petaluma City Council has determined to be significant based on local, state, and federal criteria. The city's Historic and Cultural Resource Committee and its Planning Commission review all proposed landmarks.  Designated landmarks and properties in historic districts cannot be demolished or renovated without review and permitting approval by these bodies.  The city automatically includes nationally recognized sites, such as places listed on the National Register of Historic Places, as Petaluma landmarks.

Petaluma Historic Districts
The Petaluma Historic Commercial District was listed on the National Register of Historic Places in 1995, and the city established design guidelines for the district in 1999.  In addition the city has designated at least two more historic districts:
A Street Historic District, established in 1986, and the 
Oakhill-Brewster Historic District, established in 1990.

"Warehouse District" may or may not also be designated.

Petaluma Historic Landmarks

See also
List of National Historic Landmarks in California
California Historical Landmarks in Sonoma County, California

References 

National Historic Landmark
Historic Landmark
History of Sonoma County, California